Kordeh Deh may refer to:
 Kordeh Deh, Ardabil
 Kordeh Deh, East Azerbaijan